Jal Sahelis are group of women from Bundhelkhand who are engaged in reviving dry water bodies. The women in the group are illiterate or semi literate. The group works without any government support. Their hard efforts resulted in development of villages in the region in many ways.

History 

Jal Sahelis was formed in 2005 with group of women from Madhogarh village in Jalaun Tehsil of Bundhelkhand region. It is a group of around 1000 women engaged in improving 200 villages. Their efforts are spread over 7 districs in Madhya Pradesh and Uttar Pradesh. The women in the group are aged in the group of 18 years to 70 years.
To resolve water crisis they conduct meetings with local panchayat bodies. The women in the area earlier had to walk long distances for a pot of water and the area also lost agriculture productivity due to water shortage. Around 100 villages in four districts of Uttar Pradesh could resolve water issues due to their efforts. In 2022, they released manifesto for political parties on Environmental conservation.

Efforts 

Their efforts helped in 1. Improvement in socio-economic development 2. Improvement in agriculture productivity with one crop to three crops in a year 3. Filling up of dry water bodies 4. Construction of check dams5. Dig wells 6.build reservoirs 7.handpumps repair and installation 8.removed water wastage by creating soak pits 9.Dig ponds 10.Lake building. It resolved caste fights on water in the village.

Award 

 United Nations Development Programme had awarded group with Water Champion Award.

See Also 

 Water scarcity in India

References 

Bundelkhand
Water
Environmentalism in India